The 17th Army was an army-level command of the German Army in World War I.  It was formed in France on 1 February 1918 from the former 14th Army command.  It served exclusively on the Western Front and was dissolved on 19 January 1919.

History 
17th Army was one of three armies (along with 18th Army and 19th Army) formed in late 1917 / early 1918 with forces withdrawn from the Eastern Front.  They were in place to take part in Ludendorff's German spring offensive.  The Germans had realised that their only remaining chance of victory was to defeat the Allies before the overwhelming human and matériel resources of the United States could be deployed. They also had the temporary advantage in numbers afforded by nearly 50 divisions freed by Russia's withdrawing from the war (Treaty of Brest-Litovsk).

The Headquarters was located at St Amand until 6 April 1918, Douai until 1 May 1918, Denain until 18 October 1918 and Mons until start of the march back, reaching Zülpich for disbandment on 19 January 1919.

Order of Battle, 30 October 1918 
By the end of the war, the 17th Army was organised as:

Commanders 
17th Army had the following commanders:

Glossary 
 or army detachment in the sense of "something detached from an army".  It is not under the command of an army so is in itself a small army.
 or army group in the sense of a group within an army and under its command, generally formed as a temporary measure for a specific task.
 or army group in the sense of a number of armies under a single commander.

See also 

17th Army (Wehrmacht) for the equivalent formation in World War II
German Army order of battle, Western Front (1918)

References

Bibliography 
 
 

17
Military units and formations established in 1918
Military units and formations disestablished in 1919